Sir Emanuel Moore, 3rd Baronet (1685 – 1733) was an Anglo-Irish politician. 

Moore was the son of Sir William Moore, 2nd Baronet and Catherine Percival, and in 1693 he inherited his father's baronetcy. Between 1715 and 1727 he was the Member of Parliament for Downpatrick in the Irish House of Commons. 

He married Catherine Alcock on 17 February 1708; together they had four daughters and one son, Charles, who succeeded to his title.

References

1685 births
1733 deaths
18th-century Anglo-Irish people
Baronets in the Baronetage of Ireland
Irish MPs 1715–1727
Members of the Parliament of Ireland (pre-1801) for County Down constituencies